Belliella marina  is a Gram-negative, rod-shaped and strictly aerobic bacterium from the genus of Belliella which has been isolated from seawater from the Indian Ocean.

References 

Cytophagia
Bacteria described in 2015